The 2015 Manitoba Scotties Tournament of Hearts, the provincial women's curling championship of Manitoba, was held from January 21 to 25 at the Winkler Centennial Arena in Winkler, Manitoba. The winning team was the Jennifer Jones rink from Winnipeg, the defending Olympic champions. They went on to represent Manitoba at the 2015 Scotties Tournament of Hearts in Moose Jaw, Saskatchewan.

Teams
The teams are listed as follows:

Round-robin standings
Final round-robin standings

Round-robin results
All draw times are listed in Central Standard Time (UTC−6).

Draw 1
Wednesday, January 21, 8:30 am

Draw 2
Wednesday, January 21, 12:15 pm

Draw 3
Wednesday, January 21, 4:00 pm

Draw 4
Wednesday, January 21, 8:15 pm

Draw 5
Thursday, January 22, 8:30 am

Draw 6
Thursday, January 22, 12:15 pm

Draw 7
Thursday, January 22, 4:00 pm

Draw 8
Thursday, January 22, 7:45 pm

Draw 9
Friday, January 23, 8:30 am

Draw 10
Friday, January 23, 12:15 pm

Draw 11
Friday, January 23, 4:00 pm

Draw 12
Friday, January 23, 7:45 pm

Draw 13
Saturday, January 24, 8:30 am

Draw 14
Saturday, January 24, 12:15 pm

Tiebreaker
Saturday, January 24, 4:00 pm

Playoffs

R1 vs. B1
Saturday, January 24, 6:00 pm

R2 vs. B2
Saturday, January 24, 8:30 pm

Semifinal
Sunday, January 25, 11:30 am

Final
Sunday, January 25, 4:00 pm

References

Manitoba Scotties Tournament of Hearts
Scotties Tournament of Hearts
Curling in Manitoba
Sport in Winkler, Manitoba
Manitoba Scotties Tournament of Hearts